Jo Kwon ( born on August 28, 1989)  is a South Korean singer, television host, actor, entertainer and the leader of South Korean boy band 2AM. He has starred in multiple musicals such as Jesus Christ Superstar playing the role of King Herod and Everybody's Talking About Jamie playing as Jamie New.

Predebut 
Jo trained at JYP Entertainment for seven years after joining the company. He was chosen as the last member of Park Jin-young's "99% Challenge Project" along with Sunye of Wonder Girls.

2AM career 

In 2008, he appeared on Mnet's Hot Blood. The program showed the intense physical training that thirteen male trainees go through to acquire the opportunity to debut in either a four-member ballad group or a seven-member dance group. After several elimination steps, Jo was chosen for a position in the four-member ballad group 2AM. He became the group's leader.

2AM's first single "This Song" was released on July 21, 2008. In March 2015, Jo renewed his contract with JYP Entertainment, while three other members of 2AM signed with other agencies. JYP Entertainment assured that the departures did not mean 2AM was disbanding, however 2AM is currently on temporarily break from any group activities.
He left JYP Entertainment on September 22, 2017. On November 3, 2017, he signed with Cube Entertainment.

Solo career

2008-2009: Variety entertainment and popularity as Adam Couple 
Jo has appeared as a regular panel member on variety shows such as Star King. He was part of Dirty Eyed Girls in an episode of 2PM's variety show Wild Bunny, performing a parody of popular Brown Eyed Girls song Abracadabra. The music video became popular. In September, 2009, he was one of the main MCs for SBS' environmental variety show Find it! Green Gold with Super Junior member Shindong, SS501 member Kim Hyung-jun, and Fly To The Sky member Brian Joo. He also replaced Jay Park on historical culture variety show Nodaji.

He joined the cast of We Got Married on October 3, 2009, coupled with Brown Eyed Girls member Ga-In. Although he was initially only supposed to be featured in the Chuseok special, his appearance brought in the highest ratings yet for Season 2, so he was announced as a permanent couple. Jo was diagnosed with H1N1 on October 28, 2009, causing them to postpone filming We Got Married. He recovered quickly after treatment.

During his appearance in We Got Married, Jo and Ga-in were donned the nickname “Adam Couple” by fans. Together he released the digital single, "우리 사랑하게 됐어요 (We Fell in Love)," on December 16, 2009, which topped variety online music charts and won two awards on Music Bank's K-Charts and the "Most Popular Background Phone Music" on the Gaon Charts. 50 million won from the profits of the song were donated for rebuilding after the 2010 Haiti earthquake.

In 2010, he became a permanent cast member of Family Outing 2. He made his fifth appearance on the TV show "Happy Together" in June 2012. He made several appearances on Star King, Invincible Youth S2, Come To Play, Radio Star, Star Dance Battle, and many other shows. He is known for his "kkab" dance and often danced on variety shows. "Kkab" can be translated as hyperactive.

2010–2012: Screen debut and first solo album  
On June 30, 2010, Jo released his first solo digital single titled, 고백하던 날 (The Day I Confessed), a song he partially composed during the We Got Married broadcast for Ga-in. The song came first on Cyworld real-time charts the day after release.

The same year, he was cast in the sitcom All My Love with co-stars Park Mi-sun, Kim Kap-soo and fellow idol and former 'wife' from We Got Married Ga-in.

On June 25, 2012, he released his solo album, I'm Da One, along with a music video.

2013: Musical and drama debut 
In 2013, Jo joined the cast of a Korean Jesus Christ Superstar musical production, where he played the role of King Herod.

In the same year, on February 27, 2013, he was confirmed as one of the cast for the KBS2 drama Queen of the Office. The drama is about a talented contract worker, and the work and relationships that surround her.

2016–2017: Second solo album, fourth musical casting, Golden Tambourine, and departure from JYP Entertainment
Jo's new album Crosswalk included three tracks, two of which he wrote ― the lead single, “Crosswalk,” and the third track, “Flutter.” The second track, “It's Okay,” was written by Ryan S. Jhun and Denzil "DR" Remedios, the music producers of SM Entertainment's Shinee and f(x). Popular songwriters Esna and Aev produced the title song.

On March 17, 2016, it was announced by JYP Entertainment that Jo would be participating in the musical On The Starry Night as the role "Choi Sung-keun. The musical Ran from May 7 to May 15, 2016.

On November 10, 2016, it was announced that Jo Kwon would be co-starring on Golden Tambourine, a karaoke variety program broadcast by Mnet, which ran from December 15, 2016, until February 23, 2017.

On September 21, 2017, it was announced that Jo had officially left JYP Entertainment after 16 years. However, 2AM never did announce that they were disbanding and it is presumed that the group is on hiatus.

On November 2, 2017, it was announced that Jo had signed with Cube Entertainment.

2018–present: Lonely 
On January 10, 2018,  Jo released the digital single 새벽 (Lonely), his first release after joining Cube Entertainment. Jo was set to enlist in the Korean Army in August 2018, for his mandatory military service. On July 24, 2019, it was confirmed that he would release a special single new theme song for the ROK Army with collaboration of Shinee's Onew and Key, Exo's Xiumin, Infinite's Kim Sung-kyu, BtoB's Lee Chang-sub, 2AM's Jinwoon, Yoon Ji-sung and actors Kim Minseok, and Lee Jae-kyoon in mid-August.

As part of South Korea's effort to combat COVID-19,  Jo officially discharged from the military early on March 24, 2020. He also made his first variety show appearance after being discharged on JTBC's Knowing Bros alongside 2PM's Wooyoung, Block B's P.O & WINNER's Mino on April 4, 2020. In July 2020, Jo Kwon starred in the musical Everybody's Talking About Jamie, playing the role of Jamie New, a 16-year-old high school student, who dreams to be a drag queen, and deals with prejudice and bullies.

On August 25, 2022, it was announced that Jo Kwon will be releasing "My Regards", a remake of the Ribbon Project in collaboration with Sunye, It will be released on August 28.

Personal life 
As of 2013, Jo was attending Kyung Hee University. He entered Kyung Hee University without taking the entrance examination, with rumors alleging favouritism, because he was an entertainer. The rumors were refuted by his performance at the top of his class in his major.
In 2015, he enrolled in the Performing Arts Department of Kyunghee University's Graduate Program.

Jo is the president of the cereal cafe franchise 'Midnight in Seoul', which was founded and owned by actor-singer Yoon Kye-sang and three friends. The cafe-cereal-bar was the first of its kind in Seoul and gained popularity amongst K-pop idol singers through word-of-mouth. In May 2017, it was announced that the venture would become a franchise and that Jo would be named its president, while Yoon and others would remain official owners.

Discography

Studio albums

Singles

Soundtrack appearances

Filmography

Music videos

Film

Television series

Television shows

Web shows

Hosting

Musicals

Ambassadorship

Awards and nominations

Notes

References

External links 

1989 births
Living people
2AM (band) members
Cube Entertainment artists
JYP Entertainment artists
K-pop singers
Kyung Hee University alumni
People from Suwon
South Korean male idols
South Korean male musical theatre actors
South Korean male television actors
South Korean pop singers
South Korean television presenters
21st-century South Korean male  singers